Ocoee may refer to:

 Ocoee, Florida
 Ocoee, Tennessee
 Ocoee Middle School, in Cleveland, Tennessee
 Ocoee Street Historic District
 Toccoa/Ocoee River in Georgia and Tennessee
 , a United States Navy patrol vessel in commission from 1917 to 1918
 Ocoee, the Cherokee term for the Passiflora incarnata (Purple passionflower)

See also
Ocoee dams (disambiguation)